Scopula plantagenaria is a moth of the  family Geometridae. It is found from California to Utah east to Florida and Missouri.

The wingspan is about 21 mm.

References

P
Moths of North America
Fauna of the California chaparral and woodlands
Moths described in 1887